|}

The Oyster Stakes is a Listed flat horse race in Ireland open to thoroughbred fillies and mares aged three years or older. It is run at Galway over a distance of 1 mile 4 furlongs and 42 yards (2,452 metres), and it is scheduled to take place each year in September.

The race was first run in 1991.

Records
Leading jockey (4 wins):
 Michael Kinane– Russian Snows (1995), Theatreworld (1999), Hasanka (2007), Aliyfa (2009)
 Johnny Murtagh– Predappio (1996), Bowmore (2002), Chartres (2003), Zanughan (2011)
 Pat Smullen -  Aliya (1997), Mutakarrim (2001), Almela (2016), Airlie Beach (2017) 

Leading trainer (10 wins):
 John Oxx – 	Ebaziya (1992), Russian Snows (1995), Predappio (1996), Aliya (1997), Bowmore (2002), Chartres (2003), Hasanka (2007), Aliyfa (2009), Zanughan (2011), Tarana (2014)

Winners

See also
 Horse racing in Ireland
 List of Irish flat horse races

References
Racing Post:
, 

Flat races in Ireland
Long-distance horse races for fillies and mares
Ballybrit Racecourse